The Quebec Junior A Hockey League (QJAHL) was a Canadian junior ice hockey league based in Quebec that operated from 1972 until 1982.  The QJAHL was a member of Hockey Quebec and the Canadian Amateur Hockey Association and was eligible for the Dudley Hewitt Cup and Centennial Cup.

History
The Quebec Junior A Hockey League was formed in 1972 to give the Province of Quebec an entry in the Canadian Amateur Hockey Association's Centennial Cup playoffs.

Luc Tardif finished the 1972–73 season as the top scorer and most valuable player in the east division of the QJAHL.

In 1982, the QJAHL folded. During the final 1981-1982 season, there were only four teams left in the league: the Joliette Cyclones, the Pierrefonds Pirates, the St. Eustache Patriotes and the La Prairie Flames. Quebec would not see Junior "A" hockey again until the Black Lake Miners jumped from Junior "B" into the 1988 Dudley Hewitt Cup playoffs.  A year later the Quebec Provincial Junior Hockey League was formed.

Teams
Beauport Cascades
Cape Madeleine Barons
Granby Vics
Grand'Mere
Joliette Cyclones
La Prairie Flames
La Tuque Wolves
Lac Megantic Royals
Lachine
Longueuil Rebels
Pierrefonds Pirates
Rosemont Bombardiers
St. Eustache Patriotes
St. Foy Roosters
St. Jean
St. Jerome Alouettes
Thetford Mines Fleur de Lys
Waterloo Maroons

Champions
1973 St. Jerome Alouettes
1974 Lac-Megantic Royals
1975 St. Jerome Alouettes
1976 Lac-Megantic Royals
1977 La Tuque Wolves
1978 Thetford Mines Fleur de Lys
1979 Thetford Mines Fleur de Lys
1980 Joliette Cyclones
1981 Joliette Cyclones
1982 La Prairie Flames

References

External links
LHJAAAQ Website

Quebec Junior AAA Hockey League
Defunct ice hockey leagues in Quebec
Defunct junior ice hockey leagues in Canada
Hockey Quebec